The 1998 Irish Greyhound Derby took place during August and September with the final being held at Shelbourne Park in Dublin on 19 September 1998.

The winner Eyeman won £50,000 and was trained by Eddie Wade, owned by Gerard Kervick and bred by Jim Moore. The race was sponsored by the Ireland on Sunday.

Final result 
At Shelbourne, 19 September (over 550 yards):

Distances 
½, short-head, 2, ½, 5 (lengths)

Competition Report
In the qualifying round Eyeman trained by Eddie Wade equalled Dew Reward's track record of 29.97 and immediately became the favourite for the competition. Larkhill Jo then posted a very fast 30.00 and the original ante-post favourite Plasterscene Gem drifted in the betting despite winning his heat.

In the second round the fastest winners were She Will Survive in 30.24, Westpark Lemon and Droopys Eric in 30.25. Eyeman then broke the Shelbourne track record again in the quarter finals, the brindle dog stopped the clock at 29.92.

Larkhill Jo won the first semi-final winning by six lengths from Odell Duke and Group Order. Eyeman continued to impress and took the second heat from the fast finishing 1998 English Greyhound Derby runner-up Tuesdays Davy and Cool Panther.

The pivotal moment in the final came when Larkhill Jo was forced wide by Tuesdays Davy and Cool Panther, this left Eyeman three lengths clear. Larkhill Jo and Cool Panther gained ground on Eyeman but then crowded each other off the fourth bend before challenging Eyeman on the run in. Eyeman held on and passed the winning post first. Cool Panther finished second and Larkhill Jo finished third.

See also
1998 UK & Ireland Greyhound Racing Year

References

Greyhound Derby
Irish Greyhound Derby